"The Foundation" is the second single from Xzibit's debut album At the Speed of Life and also appeared on the soundtrack to the film Hurricane Streets. Xzibit dedicated this song to his one-year-old son.

The song's official music video (directed by Michael Lucero) shows footage of Xzibit and his son.

DJ Muggs of Cypress Hill produced the track. The single charted at number 58 on the Hot R&B Singles chart and number 16 on the Hot Rap Singles chart.

Charts

References

1996 singles
Loud Records singles
Music videos directed by Michael Lucero
Xzibit songs
1996 songs
Songs written by Xzibit
Song recordings produced by DJ Muggs
Songs written by DJ Muggs
Songs written by Billy Joel